West of the Moon is a studio album by the alternative rock band Tuatara. It was released in 2007, after East of the Sun.

Track listing
 Bird's Eye View
 Los Angeles
 Wrong Turn
 Are You Feeling Me
 When The Love Is Gone
 The Old Carving Knife
 God's Meditation
 Playing and Being Played
 So Fine
 Never Look Back
 Bang Bang
 An Invisible Bee
 The Shifting Sands
 Kali Rides

Tuatara members
Peter Buck – acoustic and electric guitars, banjo, Appalachian dulcimer
Dave Carter – trumpet
Jessy Greene – violin, cello
Kevin Hudson – electric and upright bass
Barrett Martin – drums, vibraphone, piano, organ, Arabic drums, percussion, backing vocals
Scott McCaughey – acoustic and electric guitars, piano, organ, harmonica, backing vocals
Elizabeth Pupo-Walker – percussion

2007 albums
Tuatara (band) albums